Timipre Marlin Sylva  (born 7 July 1964) is a Nigerian politician, he is a former Governor of Bayelsa State, Nigeria, and the current Nigeria Minister of State for Petroleum Resources.

Early life and background 
Sylva was born in Brass, Bayelsa (formerly Rivers State, of which Bayelsa State was split off from in 1996), He got part of his education in Bayelsa and in Lagos, the former capital of Nigeria. He was a member of the Rivers State House of Assembly in the 1990s.

Education 
Sylva graduated from the University of Port Harcourt with distinction in English (Linguistics) in 1986. At the time, he was the best graduating student from his department and departmental valedictorian. He was subsequently awarded a Doctor in International Relations (Honoris causa) by the UBIS University in 2011. Sylva was awarded his second Doctorate (Honoris Causa) in Public Administration on the 2nd of December 2020 by AiPA (African Institute of Public Administration), Leading Edge Foundation and LBBS.

Political career 
Sylva's political career started in 1992 when he won a seat in the House of Assembly Election representing Brass constituency in old Rivers State. At the time, he was the youngest of all the members in the house of Assembly. His political career continued when he was appointed as the Special Assistant to the Minister of State for Petrolatum in 2004 under the auspices of Dr Edmund Daukoru. He continued in that position until he resigned to join the PDP gubernatorial primaries in 2006 in Bayelsa State, in which he placed, second behind Dr. Goodluck Jonathan. After the PDP presidential primaries election and Dr. Jonathan was appointed as a running mate to Umaru Musa Yar'Adua of blessed memory, the gubernatorial candidacy for PDP became vacant, and conventional wisdom took the better of the political actors and Sylva was elevated to occupy the position of PDP gubernatorial candidate.

As a candidate of the People's Democratic Party Sylva won the 2007 Bayelsa State gubernatorial election and succeeded Goodluck Jonathan who went on to the position of Vice President. During his inauguration he said that Bayelsa was "the least developed industrially and commercially" of all 36 states.

Sylva's opponent in the 2007 election, Ebitimi Amgbare of the Action Congress, legally challenged his victory. Although the Bayelsa State Election Petitions Tribunal upheld Sylva's election, Amgbare took the matter to the Appeal Court in Port Harcourt which overturned the Tribunal's decision and nullified Sylva's election on April 15, 2008. The Appeal Court's five justices were unanimous in their decision and ordered that Speaker Werinipre Seibarugo be sworn in to replace Sylva as acting Governor, with a new election to be held within three months.

A new election was held on May 24, 2008, and Sylva, again running as the PDP candidate, was overwhelmingly elected with 588,204 out of about 598,000 votes. He was sworn in again on May 27, saying on this occasion that he would form a broadly inclusive unity government. On January 27, 2012, his tenure was terminated by the Supreme Court with an acting governor appointed to oversee the state until the election of February 2012. Sylva was appointed by President Buhari on Wednesday, August 21, 2019, as the Nigerian Cabinet Minister of State for Petroleum Resources.

Corruption allegations
After the passage of the Petroleum Industry Bill (PIB) in August 2021, Sylva was accused of facilitating the bribery of federal legislators to guarantee the legislation's advancement despite significant public opposition to parts of the text. According to Peoples Gazette reporting, at least $10 million was paid to legislators in payments organized by Sylva and Akwa Ibom North-East Senator Bassey Albert Akpan with between $1.5 million and $2 million going to both Senate President Ahmad Lawan and House Speaker Femi Gbajabiamila. Multiple legislators corroborated the story with several legislators expressing anger, not that the Gbajabiamila and Lawan allegedly took bribes but instead that the bribes were not shared equally among the legislators as other legislators claimed to have received $5,000 for representatives and $20,000 for senators. Gbajabiamila, Lawan, Sylva, and Akpan all declined to comment on the story.

Award
In October 2022, a Nigerian national honour of Commander of the Order of the Niger (CON) was conferred on him by President Muhammadu Buhari.

See also
List of Governors of Bayelsa State

References

External links

Living people
1964 births
Governors of Bayelsa State
University of Port Harcourt alumni
Peoples Democratic Party state governors of Nigeria
Nigerian politicians